Giuseppe Pennella was an Italian Lieutenant General who was a highly decorated officer of the Royal Italian Army. During the First World War he held very high positions, commanding in succession: the "Grenadiers of Sardinia" Brigade, 35th Division , XI Army Corps, 2nd Army, 8th Army and the XII Army Corps. At the head of the 35th Division he operated in the Macedonian front, but was exonerated from command at the request of the French general Sarrail who was commander of the Armée d'Orient, as both had a strong disagreement over command.

Biography
He was born in Rionero in Vulture on August 8, 1864, son of Antonio and Maddalena Plastino. He left his native country at the age of 13 to enter the Nunziatella Military School in Naples and graduated in 1882 to attend the Military Academy of Modena where he obtained the license of second lieutenant.

Between 1894 to 1899 and 1902 , he carried out accurate surveys in the areas of San Gottardo, Haute Savoie, the Ligurian Apennines, the Jura and Switzerland. With the outbreak of the First World War he was promoted to the rank of colonel, and on May 1915, with the approach of Italy's entry into the war he became head of the secretarial office of the Chief of Staff of the Royal Italian Army of General Luigi Cadorna. In November of the same year he obtained  the command of the "Granatieri di Sardegna" Brigade, replacing General Luigi Pirzio Biroli. The grenadiers under his orders distinguished themselves at "Altitude 188", in front of Gorizia, and then in the defense of Monte Cengio, during the very hard and bloody Battle of Asiago on June 3, 1916. After participating in the sixth (August 6-17), and Seventh Battle of the Isonzo from September 14 to 18, on December 4. he left the command of the brigade to Colonel Brigadier Giovanni Albertazzi, and on the 21st of the same month he assumed the post of Chief of Staff of the 4th Army, cooperating in the defense of Cadore and the defensive actions of the Fasso Alps, to then move on to that of the 3rd Army.

Between April 26 and May 24, 1917 he was Commander of the 35th Division and at the same time of the Allied Army of the Orient, replacing General Carlo Petitti di Roreto, but came into conflict with the French general Maurice Sarrail, commander of the Armée d 'Orient but was removed from office by Cadorna. He also distinguished himself on the Balkan front, so much so that he was awarded the Commander's Cross of the Order of the Star of the Karađorđević. In October of the same year he was appointed commander of the 11th Army Corps, to pass on March 1, 1918, on the decision of the new Chief of Staff Armando Diaz, at the head of the 2nd Army which left on June 1 to take over that of the 8th Army of Montello. He took part in the Solstice Battle , at the end of which, under pressure from the Deputy Chief of Staff, General Pietro Badoglio, Diaz removed him from command, replacing him with General Enrico Caviglia. He took part in the Battle of Vittorio Veneto at the head of the XII Army Corps advancing on the Altopiano dei Sette Comuni, freed Pergine Valsugana, avoiding atrocities committed in other places by the Austro-Hungarian retreat. At the end of the conflict he was wounded five times, twice promoted for war merits, and highly decorated for military valor with three silver medals and one in bronze for military valor, the Knight's Cross, and then that of Commander, of the Military Order of Savoy and the War Merit Cross.

In 1919 he was designated by the Italian government to command a force of 85,000 men who would have had to intervene in Georgia in order to maintain the independence of the new Caucasian countries from the aims of the nascent Soviet Union but this expedition wasn't then carried out. 

He then assumed command of the Army Corps of Florence and also held the position of president of the Florentine Provincial Deputation, being placed in reserve position in 1920 . After obtaining various decorations, he died in Florence in 1925.

Legacy
Commissioned by a committee chaired by Benito Mussolini, Armando Diaz, Luigi Cadorna and other civil and military personalities, his native town of Rionero in Vulture had erected a bronze statue dedicated to him. In June 1968, on the fiftieth anniversary of the Second Battle of the Piave River, the municipality of Pergine Valsugana conferred honorary citizenship on him and dedicated the main street to him; in Giavera del Montello a monument was erected in his honor, by the sculptor Memo Botter.

Awards
Military Order of Savoy, Knight (December 28, 1916)
Military Order of Savoy, Commander (February 24, 1918)
Medal of Military Valor, Silver (Awarded Three times: August 9-15 1916, May 29 – June 3, 1916 and September 14-15, 1916)
Medal of Military Valor, Bronze (November 1-4 1918)

War Merit Cross
Commemorative Medal for the Italo-Austrian War 1915–1918
Commemorative Medal of the Unity of Italy
Allied Victory Medal
Order of Saints Maurice and Lazarus, Commander
Order of the Crown of Italy, Commander

Foreign Awards
: Croix de guerre 1914–1918
: Legion of Honour, Commander
: Order of Karađorđe's Star, Commander
: Order of the Bath, Commander

Works
Comparative study of the exercise regulations for the infantry in Germany, Switzerland, Italy, France (Reg. In force and projected), Russia and Austria, Italian publishing house, Rome, 1902.
The urgent question: the problem of paintings in the Royal Army, Italian publishing house, Rome, 1902.
The new regulation of exercises for the infantry: commented and compared to the one in force up to now, Italian publishing house, Rome, 1905
The land of the region including the surroundings of Florence: geographic and topographical tactical study, Italian publishing house, Rome, 1905
Essays on applied tactics for minor departments of the three weapons, 3 Vol., Italian publishing house, Rome, 1907-1908.
Today's machine guns in field warfare, La Speranza, Rome, 1908.
The combatant officer's vademecum, Rome, 1909.
The vademecum of the complement officer: complete summary of the ministerial programs of: tactics and service in war, fortification, topography and staffing, complementary notions, Tipografia del Senato, Rome, 1915.
The breviary of the duties of a war platoon commander, Tipografia del Senato, Rome, 1915.
Our renewed tactical-logistic regulation summarized and ordered by topic affinity, La Speranza, Rome, 1915.
Twelve months under the command of the Grenadier Brigade, 2 Vol., Printing house of the Senate, Rome, 1923.

References

Bibliography
Luigi Cadorna, The war on the Italian front. Vol. 2 , Milan, Fratelli Treves editori, 1921.
Francesco Saverio Nitti, Political writings. Volume 7 , Bari, Laterza, 1967.
Memo Botter, General Giuseppe Pennella on the centenary of his birth, Treviso, Tip. D. Cappellazzo, 1964.
Pompilio Schiarini, The Austrian offensive in Trentino (1916), Rome, Libreria del Littorio, 1929.

Notes

1864 births
1925 deaths
Italian generals
Knights of the Military Order of Savoy
Italian military personnel of World War I
People from Rionero in Vulture
Recipients of the Silver Medal of Military Valor
Recipients of the Bronze Medal of Military Valor
Commanders of the Military Order of Savoy
Commanders of the Order of Saints Maurice and Lazarus
Commandeurs of the Légion d'honneur
Knights Commander of the Order of the Bath
Recipients of the Croix de Guerre 1914–1918 (France)